Green Hills School is a private school in the Mexico City metropolitan area.
Founded in 1962, the school serves levels preschool through preparatoria (high school). The South Campus is in Col. San Jerónimo Lídice in Magdalena Contreras, Mexico City while the north campus is in Atizapán, State of Mexico.

References

External links
 Green Hills School 

High schools in Mexico City
High schools in the State of Mexico
1964 establishments in Mexico
Educational institutions established in 1964